Lily Li (born 14 June 1950) is a Hong Kong film and television actress. She is best known for her films The Wandering Swordsman, Executioners from Shaolin, One Foot Crane and The Young Master, and television series The Bride with White Hair, Blood Debt, Beyond the Realm of Conscience and Demi-Gods and Semi-Devils.

Early life 
Li was born in Hong Kong and was educated at a Christian school. At the age of 11, Li started training with Shaw Brothers Acting School where she was taught Mandarin, contemporary dancing, classical dancing, ballet and martial arts.

Career 
In 1964 at age 14, Li made her feature film debut The Last Woman of Shang and was signed to an exclusive acting contract with Shaw Brothers Studio in 1966.

After a few years playing supporting roles, Li rose to fame when she played her first leading role in the 1970 film The Wandering Swordsman directed by Chang Cheh and starred David Chiang. Li became one of the more popular of the Shaw Brothers actresses from the late 1960s through to the 1970s and she appeared in many action films and was at one time the protégé of martial arts expert, director and actor Lau Kar-leung.

Early in her career with Shaw Brothers Studio, Li appeared in many martial arts dramas and often played smart and witty heroine roles. She joined the Commercial Television network Jiayi TV and starred in the lead role of the heroine in the television series The Bride with White Hair. After the collapse of Jiayi TV in 1978, Li travelled to Taiwan and starred in martial arts films including Relentless Broken Blade/Lyrical Blade and One Foot Crane. In early 1980, Li played the lead role in individual episodes for Hong Kong's public broadcaster RTHK for the series Light and Shadow in My City presented by Ivan Ho Sau-sun called 'Under The Roof: Gap', and the sequel presented by Dominic Lam Ka-wah,  Light and Shadow in My City II'''s episode called 'The Half Life of Kam Chi'.

Li joined Rediffusion Television in 1980, now known as Asia Television (ATV), and starred in several television series including Blood Debt, Super Hero, 101 Citizen Arrest, Drunken Fist 2, Fly Over the Ring, The Devil Force and House Man. During her time with ATV, Li continued travelling to Taiwan to star in television dramas including Elephant Flying Across the River and Shaolin Disciple and appeared in independent Hong Kong films including The Young Master, Daggers 8 and Dreadnaught.

In 1988, Li left Asia Television and switched to TVB. She starred in numerous supporting roles including The Final Combat, The Legend of the Invincible, The Blood Hounds, State of Divinity, Better Halves and Beauty at War. Li left TVB in January 2020 after deciding not to renew her contract, ending a 32-year relationship with the TV network.

Filmography
 Note: Most of the characters' names are in Cantonese romanisation.''

Television (TVB)

Television (ATV)

Television (RTHK)

Television (CTV)

Television (International TV)

Films (Shaw Brothers Studios)

Films (Independent Film Studios)

Awards and achievements

References

External links
 
 Lily Li Gallery at Global Gallery Ladies
 李麗麗 Lily Li Li-Li Hong Kong Cinema
 Lily Li Mtime Chinese

20th-century Hong Kong actresses
21st-century Hong Kong actresses
1950 births
Living people
Hong Kong film actresses
Hong Kong television actresses
Chinese film actresses
TVB actors
TVB veteran actors
Shaw Brothers Studio films